The Harvill Book of Twentieth-Century Poetry in English is a poetry anthology edited by Michael Schmidt, and published in 1999. Schmidt is an American academic and long-term UK resident, who is the founder of Carcanet Press; he has also written extensive biographical books about poets.

Poets in The Harvill Book of Twentieth-Century Poetry in English
These 117 poets are represented in the anthology:

Simon Armitage
John Ash
John Ashbery
W. H. Auden
George Barker
James K. Baxter
Patricia Beer
John Berryman
John Betjeman
Sujata Bhatt
Elizabeth Bishop
Eavan Boland
Kamau Brathwaite
Basil Bunting
Gillian Clarke
David Constantine
Wendy Cope
Hart Crane
E. E. Cummings
Allen Curnow
Donald Davie
H. D.
Mark Doty
Keith Douglas

Carol Ann Duffy
Robert Duncan
T. S. Eliot
William Empson
Elaine Feinstein
James Fenton
Roy Fisher
Veronica Forrest-Thomson
Robert Frost
Allen Ginsberg
Louise Glück
Jorie Graham
W. S. Graham
Robert Graves
Ivor Gurney
Sophie Hannah
Thomas Hardy
Tony Harrison
Gwen Harwood
Seamus Heaney
Geoffrey Hill
Michael Hofmann
A. D. Hope

A. E. Housman
Langston Hughes
Ted Hughes
Randall Jarrell
Robinson Jeffers
Elizabeth Jennings
David Jones
Patrick Kavanagh
Thomas Kinsella
Rudyard Kipling
R. F. Langley
Philip Larkin
D. H. Lawrence
Gwyneth Lewis
Robert Lowell
Mina Loy
Norman MacCaig
Hugh MacDiarmid
Sorley MacLean
Louis MacNeice
Derek Mahon
Bill Manhire
Glyn Maxwell
James Merrill

Charlotte Mew
Christopher Middleton
Edna St. Vincent Millay
Robert Minhinnick
Marianne Moore
Edwin Morgan
Andrew Motion
Edwin Muir
Paul Muldoon
Les Murray
Lorine Niedecker
Frank O'Hara
Charles Olson
George Oppen
Wilfred Owen
Michael Palmer
John Peck
Robert Pinsky
Sylvia Plath
Ezra Pound
F. T. Prince
John Crowe Ransom
Henry Reed

Adrienne Rich
Laura Riding
Theodore Roethke
Isaac Rosenberg
E. J. Scovell
Peter Scupham
Burns Singer
C. H. Sisson
Iain Crichton Smith
Stevie Smith
Stephen Spender
Wallace Stevens
Dylan Thomas
Edward Thomas
R. S. Thomas
Charles Tomlinson
Jeffrey Wainwright
Derek Walcott
Richard Wilbur
William Carlos Williams
Yvor Winters
Judith Wright
W. B. Yeats

See also
 2000 in poetry
 2000 in literature
 20th century in literature
 20th century in poetry
 American poetry
 English poetry
 List of poetry anthologies

1999 poetry books
British poetry anthologies